The pre-season of the 2020–21 NBL season, the 43rd season of Australia's National Basketball League, started on 13 November 2020 and concluded on 9 January 2021.

Games

Adelaide 36ers pre-season

Brisbane Bullets pre-season

Cairns Taipans pre-season

Perth Wildcats pre-season

Sydney Kings pre-season

Pre-season ladder

References

Pre-season